Railway Square is a plaza at the southern end of the Sydney central business district, New South Wales, Australia, formed by the confluence of Broadway, Lee Street, Pitt Street and George Street. The square itself is a very busy intersection and is the site of a large bus terminus. The University of Technology, Central railway station and the now-closed Kent Brewery are adjacent to Railway Square.

History

 
Railway Square was originally known as Central Square. In the 19th century and early 20th century, Central Square was the heart of the city's modern retail district, enhanced by the presence of Central railway station and its adjacent hotels, erected to serve country visitors arriving in Sydney by train. The Marcus Clark department stores were located in a number of buildings at Central Square. The Parcel Post Office in Lee Street was built in 1913, having been designed by George McRae, the government architect. It was later restored and converted to the Medina Hotel.

The area was previously a busy nexus for the electric tramways of Sydney until the system's closure in the late 1950s.
Until the 1990s, Railway Square had a three-platform bus terminal in its centre. The platforms were connected to one another, as well as the opposite sides of Lee Street and Broadway, by an extension of the Devonshire Street Tunnel. The tunnel was accessible by escalator.

The site was redeveloped in 1999 to incorporate two platforms, lifts, a cafe and access to the University of Technology. The site was fitted with public artwork created by Merilyn Fairskye, including murals, illuminated wall panels and four towers with coloured steel ribbons inside, representing the four elements (Air, Water, Earth and Fire). Railway Square is dominated by the rising glass bus terminal structure, and by four sculpture light towers. The area is now an interchange for Busways and Transit Systems bus routes.

Rail tunnel
Railway Square is not only traversed underneath by the extension of the Devonshire Street pedestrian tunnel, but also by a railway tunnel that runs underneath at the southern end of the square, known as the Darling Dive. The tunnel was part of the Metropolitan Goods line linking the main lines south from Central with Darling Harbour. This tunnel is the oldest railway tunnel in New South Wales and is now disused. The section of the rail line between the tunnel and the Powerhouse Museum is now a park and pedestrian pathway called The Goods Line. The section beyond the Powerhouse Museum has been converted to light rail.

Gallery

See also

 Broadway, Sydney
 Parramatta Road
 Great Western Highway

References

 
Sydney localities
Squares in Sydney